Raniere may refer to:

Surname
Keith Raniere, American sex offender and leader of the NXIVM sex cult

First name
Raniere Silva dos Santos, Brazilian-Luxembourgish goalkeeper